LII may refer to:

 Year AD 52, in Roman numerals
 52 (number) in Roman numerals
 Laser-induced incandescence, a method of measuring particle sizes in flames
 Legal Information Institute, a non-profit public service of Cornell Law School
 Logical Intuitive Introvert, one of the 16 classifications of people in socionics
 Gromov Flight Research Institute, a Russian aircraft test base (ЛИИ, or LII, in Russian)
 Super Bowl LII, was the fifty-second NFL Super Bowl

See also
 L2 (disambiguation)